Upper Darby School District (UDSD) is a large public school district of approximately 12,000 students in Upper Darby Township, Delaware County, Pennsylvania. It consists of an  area including Upper Darby Township, Clifton Heights borough, and Millbourne borough. According to 2009 local census data, it serves a resident population of 90,000. In 2009, the district residents’ per capita income was $20,699, while the median family income was $51,965. In the Commonwealth, the median family income was $49,501 and the United States median family income was $49,445, in 2010.

Upper Darby schools serve an increasingly diverse population: 41% of students are White, 42% are African American, 13% are Asian/Pacific Islander, 3% are Hispanic and 1% are other. In 2010, there are 877 Limited English Proficient (LEP) students speaking over 70 languages, including Punjabi, Vietnamese, Chinese, Korean, Albanian, Greek, and Urdu. Over 350 students also meet the state criteria for immigrant status.	In addition, the district annually educates more than 380 students who have refugee status and/or limited formal schooling. In the past seven years, the percentage of students who meet the low-income status set by the Federal Free/Reduced Lunch Program has risen from 23% to almost 50%.

Schools

Upper Darby School District operates one high school, two middle schools, ten elementary schools, one kindergarten center, and a cyber academy.

High school
Upper Darby High School (UDHS), Grades 9-12

Middle schools
Beverly Hills Middle School (BHMS), Grades 6-8
Drexel Hill Middle School (DHMS), Grades 6-8
Elementary schools
Aronimink Elementary, Grades 1-5
Bywood Elementary, Grades 1-5
Charles Kelly Elementary, Grades 1-5
Garrettford Elementary, Grades 1-5
Highland Park Elementary, Grades 1-5
Hillcrest Elementary, Grades K-5
Primos Elementary, Grades K-5
Stonehurst Hills Elementary, Grades 1-5
Upper Darby Kindergarten Center, Grade K
Walter M. Senkow Elementary, Grades 1-5
Westbrook Park Elementary, Grades K-5

Extracurriculars
The district offers a variety of clubs, activities and sports.

Sports
The District is assigned to Pennsylvania Interscholastic Athletic Association (PIAA) District 1

The District funds the following sports for high school students:

Boys
Baseball - AAAA
Basketball - AAAA
Cross Country - AAA
Football - AAAA
Golf - AAA
Indoor Track and Field - AAAA
Lacrosse - AAAA
Soccer - AAA
Swimming and Diving - AAA
Tennis - AAA
Track and Field - AAA
Wrestling - AAA

Girls
Basketball - AAAA
Cheerleading - AAAA
Cross Country - AAA
Field Hockey - AAA
Golf	 - AAA
Indoor Track and Field - AAAA
Lacrosse - AAAA
Soccer (Fall) - AAA
Softball - AAAA
Swimming and Diving - AAA
Tennis - AAA
Track and Field - AAA
Volleyball - AAA

According to PIAA directory July 2012

References

Further reading
 Upper Darby School District ARRA Case Studies (Archive)

External links
Upper Darby School District website
Upper Darby School District website (Archive)
Delaware County Youth Initiative
Upper Darby Performing Arts Center
Delaware County IU 25
Delaware County Technical High School
Delaware County Workforce Investment Board

School districts in Delaware County, Pennsylvania